Eden Stars is a Barbados football club, based in Eden Lodge in the southwestern parish of Saint Michael, Barbados.

After winning the Second Division title in 2008, they were relegated in 2009.

Achievements
none

Football clubs in Barbados